Arab Palestinian Investment Company was founded in September 1994 by several Arab businessmen to channel investment into Palestine. Since its founding, APIC has become one of the largest operators in Palestine, employing over 2000 employees. Subsidiaries of APIC offer a wide array of products and services through distribution rights agreements with multinational companies that include Philip Morris, Procter & Gamble, Kellogg's, Hyundai, Chrysler, Dodge, Jeep, Alfa Romeo, Fiat, Fiat Professional, XL Energy, Abbott, B. Braun, Eli Lilly, GlaxoSmithKline, Sanofi Aventis and Nivea, among many others. APIC is located in Amman, Jordan and Ramallah, Palestine.

APIC was registered in the British Virgin Islands in September 1994. In 1996, it was registered with Palestine's Ministry of National Economy as a foreign private shareholding company, and became into a foreign public shareholding company in 2013. In March 2014, APIC shares were listed on the Palestine Exchange (PEX: APIC). Its authorized capital is US$100 million, and its paid-up capital is US$89 million as of December 2019.

In May 1995, the sole director Khaldoun Sorour was replaced by Omar Aggad, a Saudi businessman with Palestinian origins. He is the founder of Aggad Investment Company (AICO), and the founder and former chairman of Arab Palestinian Investment Company (APIC). He is best known for having led a group of investors to purchase 25% of Smith Barney in 1982, and served on its board of directors. The Wall Street Journal noted that “Aggad is considered one of Saudi Arabia’s most savviest and professional managers. In a recent book about Arabian merchants, British writer Michael Fields calls him ‘bold and impulsive, an intuitive decision-taker with a huge head for detail.’  As a partner with other Saudi and foreign investors, Aggad operates 23 manufacturing plants scattered across Saudi Arabia."

He is also a founding shareholder and director of InvestCorp Bank and was founding director of the Saudi British Bank while serving on the board of directors for 20 years

Aggad is also a well-known philanthropist in the Arab world, as the faculty of engineering at Birzeit University is named after him, and he served as an honorary trustee of the university. He has also been an active supporter of many charities both in Saudi Arabia and Palestine.

The Chairman and CEO of APIC is Omar Aggad’s son, Tarek Aggad.

The Palestinian Commercial Services Company was a shareholder in APIC, and transferred its shares to the Palestinian Investment Fund (PIF) the sovereign wealth fund of the Palestinian people, after it was established in 2003. PIF Owns 18% of APIC, and Tarek Aggad owns 27%. Tarek Aggad is now Chairman and CEO.

As an investment holding company, APIC's investments are diverse, spanning across the manufacturing, trade, distribution and service sectors, with a presence in Palestine, Jordan, Saudi Arabia and the United Arab Emirates through its nine subsidiaries, which include National Aluminum and Profiles Company (NAPCO); Siniora Food Industries Company; Unipal General Trading Company; Palestine Automobile Company; Medical Supplies and Services Company; Arab Palestinian Shopping Centers (Bravo); Sky Advertising and Promotion Company; Arab Leasing Company; and the Arab Palestinian Storage and Cooling Company..

APIC was one of the founders of the Palestine Electricity Holding Company, the Palestine Power Generating Company and it has a strategic stake in the Bank of Palestine.

References

External links

Investment companies of Jordan
Economy of the State of Palestine